Streptomyces specialis is a bacterium species from the genus of Streptomyces which has been isolated from soil in Germany.

See also 
 List of Streptomyces species

References

Further reading 
 <

External links
Type strain of Streptomyces specialis at BacDive -  the Bacterial Diversity Metadatabase

specialis
Bacteria described in 2008